The 1939 All-Southwest Conference football team consists of American football players chosen by various organizations for All-Southwest Conference teams for the 1939 college football season.  The selectors for the 1939 season included the United Press (UP).

All Southwest selections

Backs
 Kay Eakin, Arkansas (UP-1 [QB])
 Olie Cordill, Rice (UP-1 [HB])
 Jack Crain, Texas (UP-1 [HB])
 John Kimbrough, Texas A&M (UP-1 [FB])

Ends
 Herbert Smith, Texas A&M (UP-1)
 Howard Hickey, Arkansas (UP-1)

Tackles
 Jack Sanders, SMU (UP-1)
 Joe Boyd, Texas A&M (UP-1)

Guards
 Marshall Robnett, Texas A&M (UP-1)
 Leonard Akin, Baylor (UP-1)

Centers
 Robert Nelson, Baylor (UP-1)

Key
UP = United Press

See also
1939 College Football All-America Team

References

All-Southwest Conference
All-Southwest Conference football teams